Johanna Kitti Borissza is a Hungarian female track cyclist, representing Hungary at international competitions. She competed at the 2016 UEC European Track Championships in the scratch event and elimination race event.

References

Year of birth missing (living people)
Living people
Hungarian female cyclists
Hungarian track cyclists
Place of birth missing (living people)